The 1969 U.S. Professional Indoor was a men's WCT tennis tournament played on indoor carpet courts. It was played at the Spectrum  in Philadelphia, Pennsylvania in the United States. It was the second edition of the tournament and was held from February 5 through February 9, 1969. Total attendance for the five-day event was 44,538. First-seeded Rod Laver won the singles title.

Finals

Singles

 Rod Laver defeated  Tony Roche 7–5, 6–4, 6–4   
 It was Laver's 3rd title of the year and the 6th of his professional career.

Doubles

 Tom Okker /  Marty Riessen defeated  John Newcombe /  Tony Roche 8–6, 6–4
 It was Okker's 1st title of the year and the 4th of his professional career. It was Riessen's 1st title of the year and the 3rd of his professional career.

References

External links
 ITF tournament edition details

U.S. Professional Indoor
U.S. Pro Indoor
U.S. Professional Indoor
U.S. Professional Indoor
U.S. Professional Indoor